Randa Abdel-Fattah (born 6 June 1979) is an Australian writer. Randa was born in Australia and her debut novel, Does My Head Look Big in This?, was published in 2005.

Early life and education
Abdel-Fattah was born in Sydney, New South Wales on 6 June 1979 of Palestinian and Egyptian heritage. She grew up in Melbourne, Victoria and attended a Catholic primary school and Islamic secondary college, obtaining an International Baccalaureate. She wrote her first "novel", based on Roald Dahl's Matilda, when she was in sixth grade. As a teenager, she wrote short stories and produced the first draft of Does My Head Look Big in This? at about the age of 18.

Abdel-Fattah studied a Bachelor of Arts and Bachelor of Law at the University of Melbourne. During this time, she was the Media Liaison Officer at the Islamic Council of Victoria, a role that afforded her the opportunity to write for newspapers and engage with media institutions about their representation of Muslims and Islam. She completed her PhD on Islamaphobia. Abdel-Fattah was a passionate human rights advocate and stood in the 1998 federal election as a member of the Unity Party (slogan: Say No to Pauline Hanson). She has also been deeply interested in inter-faith dialogue and has been a member of various inter-faith networks. Abdel-Fattah has also volunteered time with numerous human rights and migrant resource organisations, including: the Australian Arabic council, the Victorian Migrant Resource Centre, the Islamic Women's Welfare Council, the Palestine Human Rights Campaign, and the Asylum Seeker Resource Centre.

Career
Abdel-Fattah is frequently sought for comment by the media on issues pertaining to Palestine, Islam or Australian Muslims. On Australian television, she has appeared on: Insight (SBS), First Tuesday Book Club (ABC), Q & A (ABC TV), Sunrise (Seven Network) and 9am (Network Ten). She is a regular guest at schools around Australia addressing students about her books and the social justice issues they raise. She has been a guest at book festivals in Sweden (Gothenburg 2007; Lund's LitteraLund 2008) and Malaysia (Kuala Lumpur 2008). She has also toured in Brunei and the UK.

Abdel-Fattah describes herself as a feminist and has written critical pieces on the situation of women in Saudi Arabia. She maintains that women should retain the right to wear what they want. She has stated that she refuses to discuss the veil anymore on the basis that it constitutes flogging a dead horse and detracts from the discussion of other issues.

Coming of Age in the War on Terror was shortlisted for the 2022 Victorian Premier's Prize for Nonfiction, the NSW Premier's Literary Awards' Multicultural NSW Award and longlisted for the Stella Prize.

Personal life
Abdel-Fattah resides in Sydney with her husband and four children.

Bibliography
 Does My Head Look Big in This? (2005)
 Ten Things I Hate About Me (2006)
 Where The Streets Had A Name (2008)
 Noah's Law (2010)
 The Friendship Matchmaker (2011)
 The Friendship Matchmaker Goes Undercover (2012)
 No Sex in the City (2012)
 The Lines We Cross (2016)
 When Mina Met Michael   (2016)
 "Australian Muslim Voices on Islamophobia, Race and the 'War on Terror'" (Bibliography, Meanjin Quarterly, 9 April 2019)
 Arab Australian Other: Stories on Race and Identity, co-editor with Sara Saleh (2019)
Coming of Age in the War on Terror, (2021)

References

External links

 Official Website
 
 Interview on Insideadog
 Kathleen Mitchell Award

1979 births
Australian children's writers
Australian people of Egyptian descent
Living people
Muslim writers
Australian people of Palestinian descent
Australian Muslims
Palestinian children's writers
Melbourne Law School alumni
Australian women children's writers
Palestinian women children's writers
21st-century Australian women writers